Galgamuwa Vidanalage Susantha Punchinilame (born 6 April 1961) is a Sri Lankan politician, originally from Ratnapura and the son of G. V. Punchinilame. He is a member of parliament and a government minister.

Criminal charges 
He was the main suspect in the murder of Nalanda Ellawala, a member of parliament who was killed during a shootout between supporters belonging to the United National Party and the People's Alliance in the Kuruwita area on 11 February 1997. However, Punchinilame has been cleared of all charges and was subsequently released on 18 December 2013.

References

Sources
 

Living people
Members of the 10th Parliament of Sri Lanka
Members of the 11th Parliament of Sri Lanka
Members of the 12th Parliament of Sri Lanka
Members of the 13th Parliament of Sri Lanka
Members of the 14th Parliament of Sri Lanka
Members of the 15th Parliament of Sri Lanka
Sri Lanka Podujana Peramuna politicians
Government ministers of Sri Lanka
United National Party politicians
United People's Freedom Alliance politicians
1961 births
People from Ratnapura